Russell J. Black is an American politician from Maine. Black, a Republican from Wilton, has represented  District 17 in the Maine Senate since 2018 when he replaced fellow Republican Tom Saviello. From 2010 to 2018, Black served in the Maine House of Representatives for District 114.

Background
Black attended Central Maine Community College and Wentworth Institute of Technology. He is married with four children.

References

Year of birth missing (living people)
Living people
People from Wilton, Maine
Republican Party members of the Maine House of Representatives
Republican Party Maine state senators
Central Maine Community College alumni
Wentworth Institute of Technology alumni